Tarlmounia is a plant genus in the family Asteraceae. The sole species is Tarlmounia elliptica (syn. Vernonia elliptica and V. elaeagnifolia), native to India, Burma and Thailand and naturalised in southern Taiwan and Queensland, Australia. Common names include curtain creeper, vernonia creeper and parda bel.

References

Monotypic Asteraceae genera
Flora of Myanmar
Flora of India (region)
Flora of Thailand
Flora naturalised in Australia
Vernonieae